Gordemo is a hillside village in Locarno district, Switzerland, to the northwest of Gordola.

References

External links
Photographs

Villages in Ticino